Paltiel Daykan (Hebrew: פלטיאל דייקן; May 12, 1885 – February 12, 1969) was an Israeli jurist.

Early life 
Daykan was born in Lithuania, then part of the Russian Empire, in 1885. He emigrated to Mandate Palestine (now Israel) in 1921.

Awards 
 In 1957, Daykan was awarded the Israel Prize, for jurisprudence.

See also 
List of Israel Prize recipients

References 

Academic staff of the Hebrew University of Jerusalem
Israeli Jews
Israeli legal scholars
Israel Prize in law recipients
Jews in Mandatory Palestine
Lithuanian Jews
Odesa University alumni
Russian lawyers
Academic staff of Tel Aviv University
1885 births
1969 deaths
Lithuanian emigrants to Mandatory Palestine
20th-century Israeli lawyers
Burials at Segula Cemetery